Siva Shankar is a 2004 Indian Telugu-language action drama film starring Mohan Babu  and Soundarya. The film is directed by Kapuganti Rajendra, who previously worked under Dasari Narayana Rao and Soundarya's last film in Telugu. Shiva Shankar is inspired by the 2002 Hollywood film Road to Perdition. The film is presented by Mohan Babu's son Manchu Vishnu. This is the last film for Soundarya in Telugu, released after her death.

Cast 

Mohan Babu as Siva Shankar / Sivaji 
Soundarya as Padma
Natanya Singh 
Raja Murad as Sobhanadri
Riyaz Khan as Hemadri 
Jaya Prakash Reddy
Ponnambalam
Mohan Raj
Ahuti Prasad as a car driver
Brahmanandam
Ali as a hotel owner
L. B. Sriram
Venu Madhav 
AVS
Bandla Ganesh
Raghunatha Reddy
Ananth 
Chitti Babu
 GV
Raghu Babu
Abhinayashree
 Master Abhinav 
Master Vamsi

Soundtrack 
Soundtrack was composed by Ilaiyaraaja. The audio launch was held at Annapurna Studios on 31 July 2004. Several film celebrities attended the event. The song "Endhirayyo" was based on Raja's own Tamil song "Maanguyile" from Karagattakaran.
Jabilamma Uguthunnadi - Shreya Ghoshal, Tippu
Krishnaa Nuvvu Raaku - K. S. Chithra, Hariharan
Nenemi Chethunu - Malathy Lakshman
Endhirayyo - Swarnalatha, Tippu
Neetimeedhe Kaagithana - Hariharan

Release 
Idlebrain gave the film a rating of two-and-a-half out of five and wrote that "The plus points of the film are performance of Mohan Babu and music by Ilayaraja. The main drawback of the film is old-fashioned narration and taking". Full Hyderabad stated that "Shrill drama, violent costumes and blaring choreography – everything the posters promise you, and nothing you don’t see coming".

References

External links

2004 action drama films
2004 films
Indian action drama films
Films scored by Ilaiyaraaja
2000s Telugu-language films